The following is a list of notable individuals who were born in and/or have lived in Littleton, Colorado.

Arts and entertainment

Film, television, and theatre
Melissa Benoist (1988–), actress
Molly Burnett (1988–), actress
Hayden Byerly (2000–), actor
Lauren Taylor  (1998–),actress
Ryan Driller (1982–), pornographic actor
Allan Kayser (1963–), actor
Cody Longo (1988–), actor
Diane Neal (1975–), actress
Steven Christopher Parker (1989–), actor
Heather Robinson (1978–), screenwriter
Brian Ronalds (1973–), actor, director, producer
Stephen Schiff (1950–), screenwriter, journalist
Matt Stone (1971–), actor, animator, screenwriter

Journalism
Renee Chenault-Fattah (1957–), news anchor
Laura Jane Fraser (1961–), editor, reporter, travel writer
Bill Kuster (1930–2006), weatherman
Sue Manteris (1962–), news anchor
Janice Min (1969–), editor, reporter

Literature
Steven Moore (1951–), literary critic, non-fiction writer
Nancy Stohlman (1973–), writer
Sheri S. Tepper (1929–2016), writer

Music
Kris Bergstrom (1976–), taiko player
Sera Cahoone (1975–), guitarist, singer-songwriter
Dave Grusin (1934–), composer, pianist
Susan Jeske (1958–), beauty queen, singer
Riker Lynch (1991–), singer-songwriter, dancer, actor
Ross Lynch (1995–), singer-songwriter, actor
Rydel Lynch (1993–), singer, actress, dancer
David Miller (1973–), singer
Micah Ortega (1976–), guitarist
Chris Hornick (1984–), bassist

Other visual arts
Sandy Puc' (1969–), photographer

Business
Eric C. Anderson (1974–), aerospace engineer, entrepreneur
Joshua Davis (1971–), technologist, web designer
John Goscha (1984–), entrepreneur, inventor
Dan Phillips (1945–), house builder, designer

Military
Jack Swigert (1931–1982), U.S. Air Force Captain, astronaut
Danny Dietz (1980–2005), U.S. Navy SEALS Gunner's mate, Killed in action in 2005 and received the Navy Cross in 2006.

Politics

National
Gregory A. Phillips (1960–), U.S. federal judge

State
Kathleen Conti, Colorado state legislator
Linda Newell (1957–), Colorado state legislator
Joe Rice (1967–), Colorado state legislator
Christine Scanlan (1964–), Colorado state legislator
Steve Ward (1960–), Colorado state legislator

Local

Religion
David Monas Maloney (1912–1995), Roman Catholic prelate

Sports

American football
Katie Hnida (1981–), placekicker
Brandon Kaufman (1990–), wide receiver
Steve Korte (1960–), center
Karl Mecklenburg (1960–), linebacker
Ryan Miller (1989–), offensive guard
Marc Munford (1965–), linebacker
Zac Robinson (1986–), quarterback
Tom Rouen (1968–), punter

Baseball
John Burke (1970–), pitcher
Tim Burke (1959–), pitcher
Dave Dravecky (1956–), pitcher
Mark Holzemer (1969–), pitcher
Mark Huismann (1958–), pitcher
Taylor Rogers (1990-), pitcher
Tyler Rogers (1990-), pitcher
Steven Wilson (1994-), pitcher

Basketball
Jimmy Bartolotta (1986–), guard
Jared Dillinger (1984–), guard, small forward
Brooks Thompson (1970–2016), point guard, coach

Racing
Claude Burton (1903–1974), race car driver
Jake Eidson (1995–), race car driver

Soccer
Danielle Foxhoven (1989–), forward, midfielder
Kristen Hamilton (1992–), forward
Wes Hart (1977–), defender, coach
Stephen Keel (1983–), defender
Craig Thompson (1986–), midfielder
Jake Traeger (1980–), defender
Seth Trembly (1982–), defender, midfielder
Cole Bassett (2001–), midfielder

Other sports
Heather Armbrust (1977–), bodybuilder
Drayson Bowman (1989–), ice hockey center
Michael Eyssimont (1996–), ice hockey player
Nicholas Kole (1983–), figure skater
Bill Loeffler (1956–), golfer
Jonathan Lujan (1971–), alpine skier
Scott Munn (1970–), rower

References

Littleton, Colorado
Littleton